Priyanka Nair is an Indian model-turned-actress who predominantly works in Malayalam film industry. She made her debut in the Tamil film Veyyil in 2006. She gained critical acclaim for her roles in Bhoomi Malayalam, Vilapangalkappuram and Jalam.

Early and personal life
Priyanka completed her Higher Secondary School Certificate studies and studied Physics at the Mar Ivanios College, Trivandrum. During that time, she was also acting part-time in several Malayalam television series, including Umakkuyil, Megham and Akashadoothu. She considered acting in serials as "just time pass" and went on to add that she never intended to act in films, but rather wanted to be a lecturer.

Priyanka married Tamil film director and actor Lawrence Ram on 23 May 2012 at Attukal Temple in Thiruvananthapuram. They have a son Mukund Ram, born on 18 May 2013. The couple filed for divorce in 2015.

Career
She made her feature film debut in the Vasanthabalan-directed Tamil drama film Veyyil (2006) that was produced by director Shankar, in which she starred along with Pasupathy. Her debut Malayalam film was Kichamani MBA (2007) that featured her in a supporting role. The following year she starred in T. V. Chandran's Vilapangalkkappuram along with Suhasini and Biju Menon; her performance earned her the Kerala State Film Award for Best Actress. Rediff named her the top Malayalam actress of 2009, citing that she "came up with a scintillating performance". She rose to popularity after appearing opposite Mohanlal in Ividam Swargamanu.  Priyanka loves riding her Royal Enfield Bullet motorcycle.

Awards
Kerala State Film Award
 2008 – Kerala State Film Award for Best Actress- Vilapangalkkappuram
Asianet Film Award
 2008 – Second Best Actress – Vilapangalkkappuram 
South Indian Cinema and Television Academy Award
 2019 – Best Actress  – The Better Half

Filmography

Television

Serials
 Thaarattu (DD)
 Sthreejanmam (Surya TV)
 Umakkuyil (DD)
 Megham (Asianet)
 Swarnamayooram (Asianet) as ThankamThulasidalam (Surya TV)
 Sahadharmini (Asianet)
 Kurukshethram (Amrita TV)
 Aakashadoothu'' (Surya TV)
Program
Celebrity Kitchen Magic (Kairali TV) as Judge
Nostalgia (Kairali TV) as Anchor
Your Choice (Asianet) as Anchor
Priyabhavam  (Kairali TV) as Presenter
Page 3 (Kappa TV)
Sell Me the Answer as Participant
Comedy Stars (Asianet)
Red Carpet (Amrita TV) as Mentor
Parayam Nedam (Amrita TV)
Let's Rock N Roll (Zee Keralam)
Flowers Oru Kodi (Flowers TV)
Fastest Family First Season 2 (Asianet)

Endorsements
 Maruthua Panjajeeraka Gudam
 Nana
 Kerala Kaumudi
 Vanitha
 Cream Life
 Manorama
 KSFE

References

External links

Indian film actresses
Actresses in Tamil cinema
Living people
Actresses in Malayalam cinema
Kerala State Film Award winners
Actresses from Thiruvananthapuram
Year of birth missing (living people)
21st-century Indian actresses
Female models from Thiruvananthapuram
Actresses in Malayalam television
Actresses in Kannada cinema